Zhao Yong (style name Zhongmu (仲穆); 1289 – c. 1360), was a noted Chinese painter, calligrapher, and poet in the Yuan Dynasty. A native of Wuxing (吳興， now Huzhou (湖州) in Zhejiang Province), he was the second son of Zhao Mengfu. Zhao was a descendant of the Song Imperial family, the House of Zhao.

Zhao became a high official with his father's assistance. Following the style of Dong Yuan and Li Cheng, he had a talent for painting human figures, landscapes, and horses with saddle.

Genealogy
 Zhao Kuangyin
 Zhao Defang
 Zhao Weixian
 Zhao Congyu
 Zhao Shijiang
 Zhao Linghua
 Zhao Zicheng 
 Zhao Bogui
 Zhao Shichui
 Zhao Xiyan
 Zhao Yuyin
 Zhao Mengfu
Zhao Yong

References

1289 births
Date of birth unknown
Place of birth unknown
1360 deaths
Date of death unknown
Place of death unknown
Yuan dynasty landscape painters
Yuan dynasty calligraphers
Yuan dynasty poets
Politicians from Huzhou
Painters from Zhejiang
Yuan dynasty politicians
Poets from Zhejiang

14th-century Chinese calligraphers